Gwoya Tjungurrayi (c. 1895 – 28 March 1965), also spelt Gwoya Jungarai,  Gwoya Djungarai and Gwoja Tjungarrayi, was a Walpiri-Anmatyerre man of the Northern Territory of Australia. Also known by his nickname One Pound Jimmy, he became the first Aboriginal person to be featured on an Australian postage stamp. The Electoral division of Gwoja was named after him.

Early life
His first name, Gwoja, is a rendering of the Anmatyerre word Kwaty or Kwatye, meaning "water" or "rain". His last name reflects his skin name Tjungurrayi, also known as Kngwarray in Anmatyerr. As pastoralism expanded in the region during the early 1900s, encroaching further into Tjungurrayi's ancestral country, tensions intensified during the drought of the 1920s, with increasing competition over water and food. He survived the Coniston Massacre in the then Territory of Central Australia in 1928, although accounts of his survival differ:

One claimed his father was taken prisoner by Constable Murray, escaped and fled with his family to the Arltunga region east of Alice Springs. Another described Tjungurrayi 'worm[ing] his way out from among the dead and dying' at Yurrkuru to 'narrowly escape death from a hail of rifle fire poured at him by men'.

Clifford Possum Tjapaltjarri's oral account of his stepfather's capture and evasion records that a mounted policeman arrested and chained him up before 'carry him 'round to show'm every soakage. They leave him... tied up on a tree, big chain... they put leg chain too... Then everybody go out and shoot all the people... They come back and see him – nothing! This chain he broke'm with a big rock and he take off... to mine ...'.

After the massacre, Tjungurrayi spent time in Alyawarre country near Arltunga before settling at Napperby.

Tjungurrayi made and sold boomerangs, that he sold for one pound each. Some sources claim this is where the nickname 'One Pound Jimmy' comes from. Whenever asked how much one of his pieces were, he would answer "One pound, boss".

In the 1930s, Tjungurrayi and his family lived near the rations depot near Jay Creek. They trapped dingoes, selling their skins to the depot. They later moved to Hamilton Downs Station.

Tjungurrayi as a national symbol

Tjungurrayi came to public attention when photographer Roy Dunstan took a striking portrait of him in 1935, under the instruction of a young tourism executive from Melbourne, Charles H Holmes, who described the encounter:

"During a visit to the Spotted Tiger mica mine out east of Alice Springs, I once met as fine a specimen of aboriginal manhood as you would wish to see. Tall and lithe, with a particularly well-developed torso, broad fore head, strong features and the superb carriage of the unspoiled primitive native, he rejoiced under the name of 'One Pound Jimmy.'"

The image was used as the cover of Walkabout magazine in 1936. It drew such a response that the magazine's editors requested that Tjungurrayi be rewarded by the Department of Internal Affairs, with a gift of camping equipment, including a camp oven. Over the next few decades, the pictured photograph and others taken during their meeting featured in magazines and early Central Australian tourism campaigns. Holmes claimed he used the images repeatedly presenting Jimmy as a 'symbol of a vanishing race'.

Now internationally recognised, people regularly travelled to Central Australia seeking Tjungurrayi's autograph, his fingerprint. Newspaper reports suggest the attention was unwanted by Tjungurrayi, who was working at Central Mount Wedge Station at the time. He even shaved off his beard at one stage to be less recognisable.

In 1950 the image was used on an 8½ pence stamp and a 2 shillings and 6 pence (half crown) stamp. Tjungurrayi was the first Aboriginal person to appear on an Australian postage stamp. The stamp was re-released in 1952 and eventually sold over 99 million pounds. Tjungurrayi appeared on the cover of Walkabout again in September 1950.

The design of the Australian two-dollar coin was inspired by a drawing of Tjungurrayi by artist Ainslie Roberts in 1988.

The NT Electoral division of Gwoja, created in 2019, was named after Tjungurrayi.

Personal life
Tjungurrayi and his wife Long Rose Nagnala had three sons, Tim Leura Tjapaltjarri, Clifford Possum Tjapaltjarri, both notable artists, and Immanuel Rutjinama Tjapaltjarri who became a Lutheran pastor. Tim Leura Tjapaltjarri's work Ancestor Dreaming was the subject of another Australian stamp in 1988.

Tjungurrayi continued to live in the Tanami region, dying there on 28 March 1965. He is thought to have been over 70 at the time of his death. His obituary appeared in the Northern Territory News and on the front page of the Centralian Advocate, a rare honour for an Aboriginal person at that time.

Notes

References

Indigenous Australian people
1890s births
1965 deaths
Year of birth uncertain